Tenille Nicole Townes (born Nadkrynechny; January 20, 1994) is a Canadian country music singer from Grande Prairie, Alberta. In 2011, at the age of 17, she was nominated for a Canadian Country Music Award for Female Artist of the Year.

Biography 
Townes was raised in Grande Prairie, Alberta, and attended Peace Wapiti Academy high school. She was introduced to country music by her parents and grandparents during trips in the family car. At the age of nine, she attended a concert by Shania Twain during her Up! Tour bearing a sign asking for chance to sing with Twain on stage, which Twain granted. In 2009, she released the single "Home Now", a song she wrote from the perspective of a daughter whose father is posted in the war in Afghanistan, a topic she learned about in school. The track was produced by country musician Duane Steele.

She released her first album, Real, in June 2011. She has raised over $1.9 million for Sunrise House, a shelter for homeless youth in Alberta, through her annual fundraiser, Big Hearts For Big Kids. She appeared on the national television show Canada AM in August 2011, performing her single "Real Me," and has released multiple songs to radio. She released her second album, Light, in March 2013. That same year, she relocated to Nashville.

Although she started her career under her birthname, she later changed her surname to "Townes." In a 2018 interview on Everything GP, she explained, "Townes is actually from Township Road 722, which is the road that I grew up on and the house that built me essentially, so that’s where that all comes from.”

On April 13, 2018, she announced, through her official Facebook page that she had signed a record deal with Columbia Nashville. She released her first single with the label, "Somebody's Daughter," in September 2018, and it became her first to chart, where it reached number 92 on the Canadian Hot 100 and was a Number One hit on the Canadian Country chart dated February 2, 2019.

In 2018, she served as the opening act for all dates for Miranda Lambert and Little Big Town on their joint The Bandwagon Tour. In 2019 she appeared on Donovan Woods's album The Other Way, as a duet vocalist on the song "I Ain't Ever Loved No One".

Townes won four awards at the 2019 Canadian Country Music Association (CCMA) Awards, which included one for Female Artist of the year, and three for "Somebody's Daughter" which won Single, Song, and Video of the Year.

Discography

Albums

Extended plays

Singles

Other charted songs

Music videos

Awards and nominations

Notes

References

External links 
 Official website
 
 

Living people
People from Grande Prairie
Canadian people of Ukrainian descent
Canadian women country singers
1994 births
21st-century Canadian women singers
Musicians from Alberta
Canadian Country Music Association Female Artist of the Year winners
Canadian Country Music Association Single of the Year winners
Canadian Country Music Association Songwriter(s) of the Year winners
Juno Award for Country Album of the Year winners
Canadian Country Music Association Album of the Year winners